The Twenty-Four Elders appear in the Book of Revelation (4:4) of the Christian Bible.

They are described as follow:
before the throne there was a sea of glass like unto crystal... round about... were four beasts full of eyes... The four and twenty elders fall down before him... and worship him that liveth for ever and ever.

Hall of initiation 

In the centre of a huge hall is placed a throne: round about the Throne are four and twenty seats on which sit four and twenty Elders, robed in white and wearing crowns of gold. In this Assembly is introduced the Lamb that is to be initiated. In front of the Throne are four remarkable beasts (living creatures): one of them is like a lion, another resembles an eagle, the third has the appearance of a calf, and the fourth has the face of a man. These beasts have six wings each, and are full of eyes all over; and they rest not night and day, but keep on blessing the One on the Throne.

Allegorical interpretation 
Champat Rai Jain, a 20th-century Jain writer claimed that the "Four and Twenty Elders" mentioned in the Christian Bible are "Twenty-four Jain Tirthankaras". In his book, Jainism Christianity and Science, he wrote:

See also 
 The Four and Twenty Elders Casting their Crowns before the Divine Throne

References

Sources

External links 
 John P. Burke, The Identity of the Twenty-Four Elders: A Critical Monograph on Revelation 4:4

Biblical exegesis
Book of Revelation
Christian apocalyptic writings